Özlem Kaya (born 20 April 1990 in Ardahan, Turkey) is a Turkish middle-distance runner.

Kaya participated in the 3000 m steeplechase event at the 2012 Olympics and 2016 Olympics. In 2017, she competed in the women's 3000 metres steeplechase event at the 2017 World Championships in Athletics held in London, United Kingdom. She did not advance to compete in the final.

Personal best
 9:30,23 3000m steeplechase - 24 August 2015, Beijing, China (2015 World Championships)

References

External links

1990 births
People from Ardahan
Living people
Turkish female middle-distance runners
Turkish female steeplechase runners
Olympic athletes of Turkey
Athletes (track and field) at the 2012 Summer Olympics
Athletes (track and field) at the 2016 Summer Olympics
World Athletics Championships athletes for Turkey
European Athletics Championships medalists
Universiade medalists in athletics (track and field)
Athletes (track and field) at the 2018 Mediterranean Games
Universiade bronze medalists for Turkey
Medalists at the 2015 Summer Universiade
Medalists at the 2017 Summer Universiade
Mediterranean Games competitors for Turkey
21st-century Turkish sportswomen